Bogle Park is a softball stadium located in Fayetteville, Arkansas. It is the home of the Arkansas Razorbacks softball team. The stadium was built in 2007, replacing Lady'Back Field, and opened in time for the 2008 season. It is named for Bob and Marilyn Bogle. The stadium's seating capacity is 1,200, though additional seating is available behind the outfield.

Attendance
The top ten attendance figures in Bogle Park's history are listed below.

References 

Arkansas Razorbacks softball
College softball venues in the United States